Pam Richardson is an American Democratic politician from Framingham, Massachusetts. She represented the 6th Middlesex district in the Massachusetts House of Representatives from 2007 to 2011.

See also
 2007–2008 Massachusetts legislature
 2009–2010 Massachusetts legislature

References

Members of the Massachusetts House of Representatives
Women state legislators in Massachusetts
20th-century American women politicians
20th-century American politicians
People from Framingham, Massachusetts
Year of birth missing
Year of death missing